John Ryan (born 20 July 1947) is an English former professional footballer who predominantly played as a full-back.

Ryan had a professional career that lasted more than 20 years. He first joined Arsenal from non-league side Maidstone United in 1964, though he never played a first team game for Arsenal, instead playing in the reserves before being released in 1965. He went on to have spells with Fulham (1965–69), Luton Town (1969–76), Norwich City (1976–80), Sheffield United (1980–82), Manchester City (1982–83), Stockport County (1983), Chester City (1983–84) and Cambridge United (1984–85), where he also had a spell as manager.

Ryan also played in the US for Seattle Sounders and after leaving Cambridge returned to Maidstone United. He went on to manage Sittingbourne, Dover Athletic and Dulwich Hamlet.

References
Biography

1947 births
Living people
Footballers from Lewisham
Maidstone United F.C. (1897) players
Arsenal F.C. players
Fulham F.C. players
Luton Town F.C. players
Norwich City F.C. players
Sheffield United F.C. players
Manchester City F.C. players
Stockport County F.C. players
Chester City F.C. players
Cambridge United F.C. players
Cambridge United F.C. managers
English footballers
English football managers
Dover Athletic F.C. managers
English Football League players
North American Soccer League (1968–1984) players
Seattle Sounders (1974–1983) players
English expatriate footballers
Expatriate soccer players in the United States
English expatriate sportspeople in the United States
Association football defenders